Chris Reid (born 1971) is a Scottish football goalkeeper.

Chris or Christopher Reid may also refer to:

People
Christopher Reid (rapper) (born 1964), American actor, comedian, and former rapper
Christopher Reid (writer) (born 1949), Hong Kong-born British poet, cartoonist and writer
Christopher Reid (swimmer) (born 1996), South African swimmer

Fictional chatacters
Chris Reid (Doctors), soap opera character

See also
Chris Reed (disambiguation)
 Christopher Read (born 1978), English former-cricketer who was the captain of the Nottinghamshire County Cricket Club